Jerzy Giedroyc Literary Award is given for the best book of prose (including non-fiction and collections of essays) written in the Belarusian language. It is co-founded by the Embassy of Poland in Belarus, the Polish Institute in Minsk, the Belarusian PEN Centre, and the Union of Belarusian Writers in memory of the essayist and politician Jerzy Giedroyc.

Winners 

 2012
 1st place: Pavel Kastsyukevich
 2nd place: Alhierd Baharevich
 3rd place: Andrei Fedarenka
 2013
 1st place: Uladzimir Nyaklyayew
 2nd place: Alhierd Baharevich
 3rd place: Adam Hlobus
 2014
 1st place: Ihar Babkou
 2nd place: Artur Klinau
 3rd place: Vinces' Mudrou
 2015
 1st place: Viktar Kazko
 2nd place: Tatstsiana Barysik
 3rd place: Alhierd Baharevich
 2016
 1st place: Maks Shchur
 2nd place: Alhierd Baharevich
 3rd place: Andrei Adamovich
 2017
 1st place: Zmicier Bartosik
 2nd place: Ludmila Rubleuskaya
 3rd place: Adam Hlobus

References

2012 establishments in Belarus
Awards established in 2012
Belarusian literary awards
Polish literary awards